The 5th Canadian Division is a formation of the Canadian Army responsible for the command and mobilization of most army units in the provinces of New Brunswick, Nova Scotia, Prince Edward Island and Newfoundland and Labrador; as well as some units in Kingston, Ontario. The division is recognized by the distinctive maroon patch worn on the sleeve of its soldiers.

It was first created as a formation of the Canadian Expeditionary Force during the First World War. It was stood down during the war only to be reactivated through the renaming from '1st Canadian Armoured Division' to the 5th Canadian (Armoured) Division during the Second World War. It was stood down following demobilization and was again reactivated in 2013 with the renaming of the former Land Force Area Atlantic.

First World War
The 5th Canadian Division of the Canadian Corps was formed during World War I under Major-General Garnet Burk Hughes. The 5th began assembling in Britain in February, 1917, but was broken up in February 1918 before it was fully formed. The Division adopted a coloured formation patch identical in design to that worn by the four combatant divisions of the Canadian Corps. Its men were used as reinforcements for the other four Canadian divisions, helping to maintain the over-strength Divisions of 22,000–25,000 with more than 100,000 men total. It was reactivated in 2013.

Infantry units
13th Canadian Brigade:
128th (Moose Jaw) Battalion Canadian Infantry. February 1917 – May 1917. Absorbed by the 15th Canadian Reserve Battalion;
134th (48th Highlanders) Battalion Canadian Infantry. February 1917 – February 1918. Absorbed by the 12th Canadian Reserve Battalion;
160th Battalion Canadian Infantry. February 1917 – February 1918. Absorbed by the 4th Canadian Reserve Battalion;
164th (Halton and Dufferin) Battalion Canadian Infantry. May 1917 – April 1918. Absorbed by the 8th Canadian Reserve Battalion;
202nd Battalion Canadian Infantry. February 1917 – May 28, 1918. Absorbed by the 9th Canadian Reserve Battalion;
208th Battalion Canadian Infantry. May 1917 –  January 3, 1918. Absorbed by the 2nd and 3rd Canadian Reserve Battalions.

14th Canadian Brigade:
125th Battalion Canadian Infantry. February 1917 – April 16, 1918. Absorbed by the 8th Canadian Reserve Battalion;
150th (Carabiniers Mont Royal) Battalion Canadian Infantry. February 1917 – February 15, 1918. Absorbed by the 6th Canadian Reserve Battalion;
156th (Leeds and Grenville) Battalion Canadian Infantry. February 1917 – February 15, 1918. Absorbed by the 6th Canadian Reserve Battalion;
161st Battalion Canadian Infantry. February 1917 – February 15, 1918. Absorbed by the 4th Canadian Reserve Battalion.

15th Canadian Brigade:
104th (New Brunswick) Battalion Canadian Infantry. February 1917 – February 15, 1918. Absorbed by the 13th Canadian Reserve Battalion;
119th (Algoma) Battalion Canadian Infantry. February 1917 – April 16, 1918. Absorbed by the 8th Canadian Reserve Battalion;
185th (Cape Breton Highlanders) Battalion Canadian Infantry. February 1917 – February 15, 1918. Absorbed by the 17th Canadian Reserve Battalion;
198th (Canadian Buffs) Battalion Canadian Infantry. April 1917 – March 9, 1918. Absorbed by the 3rd Canadian Reserve Battalion;
199th (Duchess of Connaught's Own Irish Canadian Rangers) Battalion Canadian Infantry. February 1917 – April 1917. Absorbed by the 23rd Canadian Reserve Battalion.

Attached Troops:
164th (Halton and Dufferin) Battalion Canadian Infantry. February 1917 – May 1917. To the 13th Canadian Brigade;
198th (Canadian Buffs) Battalion Canadian Infantry. February 1917 – April 1917. To the 15th Canadian Brigade;
208th Battalion Canadian Infantry. February 1917 – May 1917. To the 13th Canadian Brigade;
236th (MacLean Highlanders) Battalion Canadian Infantry. February 1917 – May 1917. Disbanded on March 13, 1918.
12 Canadian Field Ambulance

Second World War

The 5th Canadian (Armoured) Division was a Canadian division during World War II. Following its redesignation from 1st Canadian Armoured Division, the bulk proceeded overseas in one main convoy, arriving in the United Kingdom at the end of November 1941.

The 5th Canadian (Armoured) Division spent two years of the war uneventfully in the United Kingdom, before finally transferring to the Mediterranean theatre in November 1943 to join the 1st Canadian Infantry Division as part of I Canadian Corps, under command of the British Eighth Army. The division moved without its tanks and vehicles, inheriting heavily used equipment as a legacy from the veteran British 7th Armoured Division ("The Desert Rats") who they relieved on the Italian Front. The majority of the vehicles were completely worn out, having first been issued in North Africa or were two-wheel drive–useless in Italy. It took several months for the division to be fully equipped with new vehicles, including M4 Shermans. Only the 11th Canadian Infantry Brigade was committed prior to 31 January 1944.

The 5th Armoured took part in the Italian Campaign until the end of 1944, seeing notable action on the Hitler Line after the Allied breakthrough at Cassino in May 1944 and also during Operation Olive on the Gothic Line in August 1944. During the latter battle its single infantry brigade was augmented by a second, which was raised using reinforcements and units serving in other roles. Among them was the 4th Princess Louise Dragoon Guards–1st Canadian Division's armoured reconnaissance regiment. As with other Allied armoured divisions in the Mediterranean, local resources were used to establish an additional infantry brigade, the 12th Canadian Infantry Brigade. Based on the colour of its shoulder patch, the division became known as the "Mighty Maroon Machine".

In January 1945, the division, together with the 1st Canadian Infantry Division, as part of Operation Goldflake, moved by truck, train, and naval transport to Belgium via Livorno and Marseille. After arriving on the Western Front, it disbanded the 12th Brigade, and re-equipped to join the First Canadian Army in time to participate in the final advance into Germany.

In April 1945, the Irish Regiment of Canada was assigned to Operation Cleanser in the Netherlands. They had to liberate the route from Arnhem to Harderwijk. This unexpectedly resulted in a fierce fight at the Battle of Otterlo.

Commanding officers
 Jun 1941 to Jan 1943 Major-General Ernest William Sansom
 Jan 1943 to Oct 1943 Major-General Charles Ramsay Stirling Stein
 Oct 1943 to Jan 1944 Major-General Guy Simonds
 Jan 1944 to Mar 1944 Major-General E. L. M. Burns
 Mar 1944 to Jun 1945 Major-General Bert Hoffmeister

Organization until July 1944 and after March 1945

5th Armoured Brigade
2nd Armoured Regiment (Lord Strathcona's Horse (Royal Canadians))
5th Armoured Regiment (8th Princess Louise's (New Brunswick) Hussars)
9th Armoured Regiment (The British Columbia Dragoons)
1st Battalion, The Westminster Regiment (Motor)

11th Infantry Brigade
11th Independent Machine Gun Company (The Princess Louise Fusiliers)
1st Battalion, The Perth Regiment
1st Battalion, The Cape Breton Highlanders
1st Battalion, The Irish Regiment of Canada
3rd Armoured Reconnaissance Regiment (The Governor General's Horse Guards)
11th Infantry Brigade Ground Defence Platoon (Lorne Scots)

Other units
17th Field Regiment, RCA
8th Field Regiment (Self-Propelled), RCA
4th Anti-tank Regiment, RCA
5th Light Anti-Aircraft Regiment, RCA
"G" Squadron, 25th Armoured Delivery Regiment (The Elgin Regiment)
5th Canadian Armoured Division Engineers
1st Field Squadron, RCE
10th Field Squadron, RCE
4th Field Park Squadron, RCE
5th Canadian Armoured Division Bridge Troop, RCE
5th Canadian Armoured Divisional Signals, RCSigs
No. 5 Provost Company, Canadian Provost Corps

Organization July 1944 until March 1945

5th Canadian Armoured Brigade
2nd Armoured Regiment (Lord Strathcona's Horse (Royal Canadians))
5th Armoured Regiment (8th Princess Louise's (New Brunswick) Hussars)
9th Armoured Regiment (The British Columbia Dragoons)

11th Canadian Infantry Brigade
11th Independent Machine Gun Company (The Princess Louise Fusiliers)
1st Battalion, The Perth Regiment
1st Battalion, The Cape Breton Highlanders
1st Battalion, The Irish Regiment of Canada
11th Infantry Brigade Ground Defence Platoon (Lorne Scots)

12th Canadian Infantry Brigade (raised in August 1944)
12th Independent Machine Gun Company (The Princess Louise Fusiliers)
1st Battalion, The Westminster Regiment (Motor)
4th Princess Louise Dragoon Guards (from 1st Canadian Infantry Division)
The Lanark and Renfrew Scottish Regiment (from Corps anti-aircraft assets)
3rd Armoured Reconnaissance Regiment (The Governor General's Horse Guards)
12th Infantry Brigade Ground Defence Platoon (Lorne Scots)

Other units
17th Field Artillery Regiment
8th Field Artillery Regiment (Self-Propelled)
4th Anti-tank Regiment
5th Light Anti-Aircraft Regiment
"G" Squadron, 25th Armoured Delivery Regiment (The Elgin Regiment), Royal Canadian Armoured Corps
5th Canadian Armoured Division Engineers
1st Field Squadron, RCE
10th Field Squadron, RCE
4th Field Park Squadron, RCE
5th Canadian Armoured Division Bridge Troop, RCE
5th Canadian Armoured Divisional Signals, RCSigs
No. 5 Provost Company, Canadian Provost Corps

Land Force Atlantic Area

Land Force Atlantic Area (LFAA) was created on 1 September 1991, taking command of what was previously the militia areas and the Regular Force Army units and formations in Atlantic Canada.  At that point in time, the Militia Areas ceased to exist, and the subordinate Militia Districts were reorganised. Later that decade, the reserve force districts were again reorganized into two Canadian Brigade Groups. LFAA was the formation responsible for Canadian Army operations in the Canadian provinces of New Brunswick, Newfoundland and Labrador, Nova Scotia, and Prince Edward Island and was headquartered at Canadian Forces Base Halifax.

Organization of LFAA (2010)
Regular Force
 2nd Battalion, The Royal Canadian Regiment : Oromocto (transferred to command of 2 CMBG in 2012)
 4 Air Defence Regiment, RCA : Oromocto, New Brunswick (Transformed into 4th Artillery Regiment (General Support), RCA in 2013)
 4 Engineer Support Regiment : Oromocto
 3 Military Police Unit : Halifax, Nova Scotia
 LFAA Training Centre : Oromocto
 Canadian Forces Base Gagetown : Gagetown, New Brunswick

Reserve Force
 36 Canadian Brigade Group
 37 Canadian Brigade Group
 5 Canadian Ranger Patrol Group: Gander, Newfoundland
 3 Intelligence Company: Halifax, Nova Scotia

5th Canadian Division Re-Activation 
In 2013, LFAA was re-designated the 5th Canadian Division and inherited the wartime heritage of the formation. The division continues to be headquartered at CFB Halifax and commands most Canadian Army units in the Atlantic provinces.

Organization of 5th Canadian Division (2020)

Lodger units supported by 5 CDSG

Combat Training Centre
 Royal Canadian Armoured Corps School
Royal Canadian Artillery School
Royal Canadian Infantry Corps School
Canadian Forces School of Military Engineering
Tactics School

2 Canadian Mechanized Brigade Group
2nd Battalion, The Royal Canadian Regiment

See also

 List of military divisions
 List of Canadian divisions in World War II

Notes

References

 Groningen, J. Niemeijer "History of 17th Field Regiment, Royal Canadian Artillery, 5th Canadian Armoured Division" by (J. Niemeijer Groningen, 1946)  
 Zuehlke, Mark, "The Liri Valley: Canada's World War II Breakthrough to Rome", Douglas & McIntyre Ltd., Vancouver, 2003

External links
 
 Canadian Forces Recruiting
 

Divisions of Canada in World War I
Infantry divisions of Canada
Military units and formations established in 1917
1917 establishments in Canada
Canadian 5th Armoured Division
Canadian World War II divisions
Military units and formations of the British Empire in World War II